Srimathi Srinivas is an Indian Telugu-language television drama series airing on Star Maa from 20 December 2021. The show also streams on Disney Plus Hotstar . It is the remake of 2007 Tamil series Thirumathi Selvam, which aired on  Vijay. It stars Ashwin and Ankita Amar.

Plot 
Srinivas, a mechanic falls in love with Sridevi who is a straight forward girl. To protect his love, he bluffs about his true identity and marries her. What happens when  Sridevi gets to know the truth forms the rest of the story.

The show is produced by Pixel Pictures Pvt. Ltd.

Cast

Main 
 Ashwin (2022) as Srinivas: Sridevi's husband; Gopalam's son; Mangala's step-son; Vicky and Mouni's half-brother
 Chandan Kumar (2021–2022) as Srinivas
 Ankita Amar as Sridevi: Srinivas's wife; Meenakshi and Madhava Rao's daughter; Vinod, Kavya and Karthika's sister

Recurring 
 Sri Charan as Madhav Rao; Sridevi's father
 Usha Sri (2022) as Meenakshi; Sridevi's mother
 Sheela (2021–2022) as Meenakshi
 Jyothi Reddy as Mangala: Srinivas's stepmother; Gopalam's second wife; Vicky and Mouni's mother
 Vishwa Mohan as Gopalam; Srinivas's biological father
 Basawaraj as Kikku; Srinivas's friend
 Srikar Krishna as Arjun; Sridevi's ex-fiance
 Uma Devi as Nagamani; Daksha & Gautham's mother
 Manasa Lanka as Anitha
 Bramar as Gautham; Daksha's brother
 Madhu Krishna as Daksha
 Ajay Kiran as Vicky; Srinivas's brother
 Teja Chowdary as Prakash
 Kiran Kanth as Santhosh
 Gopala Krishna Akella as Preist
 Jabardasth Ganapathi as Preist
 Netra Reddy as Geetha
 Baby Hasya Chaitra as Daksha's daughter
 Hasini Tarak as Sridevi's second younger sister
 Priya Prasad as Vidya; Srinivas's sister
 Amulya Reddy
 Aaradya Paruchuri as Kavya
 Unknown as Vinod
 Kavya Shree as Guest Appearance
 Sireesha Vallabhaneni as Guest Appearance

Adaptations

Production 
The series had actor Chandan Kumar returning to the Telugu television industry after a brief gap. The serial had Kannada actress Ankita Amar debuting into Telugu television through this serial. The show is produced by Pixel Pictures Pvt. Ltd.

References

External links 

  on Hotstar

Indian television series
Indian television soap operas
Serial drama television series
2021 Indian television series debuts
Telugu-language television shows
Indian drama television series
Star Maa original programming
Television shows set in Andhra Pradesh
Telugu-language television series based on Tamil-language television series